"Scary Tales" refers to several different versions of a Halloween-themed compilation of Walt Disney shorts, as well as an alternate and condensed version of "Disney's Halloween Treat" (1982) by the same name or derivation debuting in different years across various formats and countries:

 Scary Tales is a compilation of Walt Disney shorts. The compilation was released in 1983 on both VHS and laser disc and is the third volume in a release of Walt Disney Cartoon Classics. The running time is 52 minutes, not 43 minutes as the artwork contains this error.
 Scary Tales is a compilation of Walt Disney shorts released exclusively in Japan on LaserDisc in 1986. The running time is 91 minutes.
 Disney's Scary Tales of Halloween, as it referred to sometimes by the channel announcer, refers to an alternative title and condensed version of "Disney's Halloween Treat" (1982), released in 60-minute block formats as both syndicated and network broadcast formats on television.

1983 version

Shorts 

Donald Duck and the Gorilla (1944)
Duck Pimples (1945)
The Skeleton Dance (1929)
The Haunted House (1929)
Donald's Lucky Day (1939)
Pluto's Judgement Day (1935)

Releases
VHS (1983)
LaserDisc (1983)

1986 LaserDisc version

Shorts 

 The Skeleton Dance (1929)
 The Haunted House (1929)
 Donald's Lucky Day (1939)  
 Lonesome Ghosts (1937)  
 Donald Duck and the Gorilla (1944)  
 Pluto's Judgement Day (1935)  
 "The Legend of Sleepy Hollow" from The Adventures of Ichabod and Mr. Toad (1949) 
 Duck Pimples (1945)
 Mickey's Parrot (1938)
 Trick or Treat (1952)

1986 TV version 
"Disney's Scary Tales of Halloween" is a Halloween-themed television special which originally aired on October 19, 1986, on ABC. It is a condensed version of the 1982 special "Disney's Halloween Treat".

Shorts 

 "Madam Mim" – The Sword in the Stone (1963)
 "Night on Bald Mountain" sequence – Fantasia (1940)
 Donald Duck and the Gorilla (1944) – Donald Duck and his nephews Huey, Dewey and Louie
 "Pluto's Judgement" sequence featuring three Pluto cartoons assembled together:
 Puss Cafe (1950)
 Cat Nap Pluto (1948)
 Pluto's Judgement Day (1935)
 "Captain Hook" – Peter Pan (1953)
 "Cruella de Vil" – One Hundred and One Dalmatians (1961)
 "The Evil Queen" – Snow White and the Seven Dwarfs (1937)
 Small snippets from Trick or Treat (1952)
 Small snippets from Disneylands "The Great Cat Family" (1956)
 "Si and Am" – Lady and the Tramp (1955)
 Clip of Mickey's Parrot (1938)
 Lonesome Ghosts (1937)

Note: "The Legend of Sleepy Hollow"'s "Headless Horseman" segment appeared in network versions.

See also 
 "Our Unsung Villains" (1956)
 "Disney's Greatest Villains" (1977)
 "Disney's Halloween Hall O' Fame" (1977)
 "A Disney Halloween" (1981)
 "Disney's Halloween Treat" (1982)
 "A Disney Halloween" (1983)
Mickey's House of Villains (2002)
Once Upon a Halloween (2005)

Notes

Short film compilations
Disney home video releases
Disney-related lists